Toowong Village is a highrise building situated at the centre of the Brisbane suburb of Toowong, Queensland, Australia, on the block of land bounded by Coronation Drive, High Street and Sherwood Road. The blue glass office tower is a prominent landmark visible from Toowong and surrounding suburbs. 

Opened in 1986, Toowong Village is an office tower and shopping centre.  The complex was built on the site of the former Patterson's sawmill and over the existing Toowong railway station.  There was some controversy over its development as the Queensland Government overrode the Brisbane City Council's town plan to permit its construction.  The Brisbane City Council had refused to permit its construction because of concerns about traffic congestion in surrounding streets.

The shopping centre is located on the lower floors of the office tower, and includes the Toowong branch of the Brisbane City Library, photocopying facilities and medical centre. The shopping centre includes 86 specialty stores over an area of approximately 31,000 square metres. 

At its opening Toowong Village featured 100 retailers including anchor tenants David Jones and New World Supermarket. The atrium was styled with ornate gilt finishes and pastel colours typical of the 80s. A $50 million redevelopment which considerably modernised the centre was completed in 2015. 

In 2021, David Jones departed as an anchor tenant of the centre. Following the departure the centre underwent a range of redevelopment works, with a number of new retailers opening in late 2022, including Woolworths and TK Maxx as new anchor tenants.  

There is a lift and also travelators (a cross between a slanting moving walkway and an escalator) within the centre of Toowong Village.  The travelators allow patrons to take shopping trolleys down, or up, to other floors of the building, without requiring to use the lift. 

The Toowong Railway Station is also located in the base of the building. The entry to the station is from the Gallery level of Toowong Village.

Toowong Village is open to the public seven days a week.

Restaurants
 A food court
 Grill'd
 Guzman y Gomez
 Nandos
 San Churro

Major Retailers
 Coles (supermarket)
 Hanaromart (supermarket)
 Kmart (discount department store)
 TK Maxx (discount department store)
 Woolworths (supermarket)

Community services and facilities
A range of the services are located in the complex including the council library  and railway station etc.

Gallery

See also
 List of shopping centres in Australia

References

External links
 
 Toowong Village Official Website
 An aerial view Toowong Village is visible on the right side of the photo (near the bend in the river).

Shopping centres in Brisbane
Shopping malls established in 1986
Toowong
1986 establishments in Australia